Linwood is a residential neighborhood in Wichita, Kansas, United States. It lies in the south-central part of the city west of Interstate 135.

Geography
It consists of the area between Southeast Boulevard in the west and south, Lincoln Street in the north, and Hydraulic Avenue in the east. The Hyde neighborhood lies to the north, Schweiter to the east, Mead to the southeast, and South Central to the south and west.

Government
For the purposes of representation on the Wichita City Council, most of Linwood is in Council District 1.  A small portion of the neighborhood south of Mount Vernon Street is in Council District 3.

For the purposes of representation in the Kansas Legislature, Linwood is in the 25th district of the Kansas Senate and the 86th district of the Kansas House of Representatives.

Education
Wichita Public Schools operates one facility in Linwood:  Linwood Elementary School.

The Linwood Park branch of the Wichita Public Library is located on South Kansas Street in Linwood Park, but will be moving in 2021.

Parks and recreation

The city's Department of Park and Recreation maintains four parks in and around Linwood:  Goldenrod Park, Henry Park, North Linwood Park, and South Linwood Park. Goldenrod Park is the former site of Linwood Elementary School and includes a community facility available for rent. Henry Park is a  neighborhood park on South Ellis Street with a playground and a softball diamond. It includes a playground, an open shelter, an assembly area with a stage and seating for 300, and biking and fitness trails. It is the site of the city Park Department's greenhouse, nursery, and recreation center as well as baseball diamonds, a basketball court, biking and hiking trails, a football field, horseshoe courts, a playground, a swimming pool, tennis courts, tetherball courts, and a volleyball court.

Transportation
The primary roads through Linwood are Hydraulic Avenue, which runs north–south along the east side of the neighborhood, and Southeast Boulevard, which runs southeast–northwest along the west side of the neighborhood. Other arterial roads include Lincoln Street, which runs east–west along the north side of the neighborhood, and Harry Street, which runs east–west through its center. Interstate 135 runs north–south east of North and South Linwood Parks, accessible via interchanges at Lincoln and Harry.

Wichita Transit offers bus service to Linwood on its 14, 22, and 29 routes.

References

Geography of Wichita, Kansas
Neighborhoods in Kansas